Hendrik Jan Elhorst (29 October 1861, Wisch, Gelderland – 21 March 1924, Amsterdam) was a Dutch Mennonite teacher and minister.

He was trained at the gymnasium in Deventer and then at the Amsterdam Mennonite seminary and first served in Irnsum (Friesland) 1887-1888, Arnhem 1888-1898, The Hague 1898-1900, before being called in 1900 to serve in the Doopsgezinde kerk, Haarlem, where he became a member of the Teylers First Society in 1902. Van Gelder became a professor in the University of Amsterdam 1906-1924. He was one of the founders and editors of Teylers Theologisch Tijdschrift.

References

1861 births
1924 deaths
Dutch Mennonites
Members of Teylers Eerste Genootschap
Mennonite ministers
People from Oude IJsselstreek
Academic staff of the University of Amsterdam
19th-century Anabaptist ministers
20th-century Anabaptist ministers